Shobha Mohan is an Indian actress known for her works, predominantly in Malayalam cinema along with few Tamil films.

Biography
Shobha Mohan was born to actor Kottarakara Sreedharan Nair and Vijayalakshmi at Kottarakkara in Kollam, Kerala. She is the elder sister of Malayalam actor Sai Kumar. She made her debut in Balloon in 1982 as the heroine opposite Mukesh. She married Malayalam Theatre artiste K. Mohankumar on 5 November 1984. Actors Vinu Mohan and Anu Mohan are their sons. Actress Vidhya Mohan is her daughter-in-law.

Filmography

All films in Malayalam unless otherwise indicated

TV serials

References

External links
 
 Shobha Mohan at MSI
 malayalamcinema.com, Official website of AMMA, Malayalam Film news, Malayalam Movie Actors & Actress, Upcoming Malayalam movies

Actresses in Malayalam cinema
Indian film actresses
Actresses from Kollam
Living people
Indian television actresses
Actresses in Malayalam television
20th-century Indian actresses
21st-century Indian actresses
Actresses in Tamil cinema
Child actresses in Malayalam cinema
Year of birth missing (living people)